Fly Above EP is the first EP by American singer-songwriter Kandi Burruss. It was scheduled for release on November 10, 2009 but was pushed up to October 29, 2009 on Kandi's own record label, Kandi Koated Entertainment.

Kandi decided to release her debut EP and second album separately in order to promote her new single "Fly Above" and to finally release her long-awaited second album in the first quarter of 2010.

The EP debuted at #197 on the Billboard 200 in November 2009.

Track listing

Charts

References

2009 debut EPs
Kandi Burruss albums